The Congress of the State of Baja California Sur is the legislative branch of  the government of the State of Baja California Sur. The Congress is the governmental deliberative body of  Baja California Sur, which is equal to, and independent of, the executive.

The Congress is unicameral and consists of 21 deputies. 16 deputies are elected on a first-past-the-post basis while five are elected through a system of proportional representation. Deputies are elected to serve for a three-year term.

The Congress convenes at the “General José María Morelos y Pavón” meeting room at the Palace of Legislative Power in the state capital of La Paz.

Structure
In order to carry out its duties, the Congress is organized in the following manner:

 Management bodies (Órganos de Dirección):
 Board of Directors (Mesa Directiva)
 Political Coordination Board (Junta de Gobierno y Coordinación Política)

 Working bodies (Órganos de Trabajo):
 Permanent Committees (Comisiones Permanentes)
 Special Committees (Comisiones Especiales)

 Technical and Administrative bodies (Órganos Técnicos y Administrativos):
 Administrative Department (Oficialía Mayor)
 Finance Department (Dirección de Finanzas)
 Legal Department (Asesoría Jurídica)
 Social Communication Department (Dirección de Comunicación Social)

See also
List of Mexican state congresses

Notes

References

External links
Official website

Government of Baja California Sur
Baja California Sur
Baja California Sur